School of Fish was an alternative rock band which formed in 1989 and disbanded in 1994. The core members were Josh Clayton-Felt (lead vocals and guitar) and Michael Ward (guitar). School of Fish released two albums and are remembered for the hit single "3 Strange Days" (1991).

History
Clayton-Felt and Ward started as a duo who would play club dates in Los Angeles, California, accompanied by programmed drums and bass.

Recruiting drummer Michael Petrak and bassist David Lipson the band signed with Capitol Records in 1990, and released their first single in that same year on 7-inch vinyl. Their self-titled debut was released in March 1991, followed by their first single, "3 Strange Days." Also during the same year, they appeared on a KROQ-FM concert disc called the Acoustic Christmas. 

After the release of the first album, the rhythm section changed from Michael Petrak and Dominic Nardini to Chad Fischer and Chris MacDonald respectively. However the new members did not play on the band's second album, which featured session musicians Josh Freese and John Pierce. Nevertheless, Chad Fischer stayed with the band to play live.

School of Fish's second album, Human Cannonball, was released in 1993. The album did not sell well and was not as successful as the self-titled album.  Shortly thereafter, the band broke up.

Aftermath

Members careers
Singer Josh Clayton-Felt embarked on a solo career and released two studio albums and one live album before he was diagnosed with cancer in 1999. He died on January 19, 2000, at the age of 32 but his estate has since overseen three posthumous releases.

Guitarist Michael Ward went on to play with John Hiatt and eventually became a member of The Wallflowers. After The Wallflowers split, Ward spent many years as a member of Ben Harper's band, The Innocent Criminals. He is also a sought-after session guitarist in LA, and the author of the children's books 'Mike and the Bike' and 'Mike and the Bike Meet Lucille The Wheel.' 

Chad Fischer went on to form the band Lazlo Bane, known for original theme song of the TV show Scrubs. He also established himself as a record producer and composer.

Christopher MacDonald, who played bass with the band on tour, but did not play on any School of Fish recordings, records synthesizer space music under the name Telomere.

Releases
Two previously unreleased songs were released as downloads circa 2007. "Broken Arm" (recorded before the Human Cannonball sessions) and "Goodbye Green World" (recorded before the self-titled album sessions).

The idea of releasing a rarities compilation was in talks with surviving past members but was aborted completely.

Two songs, "Goodbye Green World" and "Who Am I Today", performed by Josh-Clayton Felt and Michael Ward were issued on Josh's third posthumous release, the EP The Spirit Shines Through.

In 2020 Chad Fischer reunited with the original members of School of Fish to record a new version of the song "3 Strange Days" which was released as a video. The track was later included on the Lazlo Bane album Someday We'll Be Together.

Members
 Josh Clayton-Felt – vocals, guitars (1989-1994)
 Michael Ward – guitars, vocals (1989-1994, 2020)
 David Lipson – bass (1989)
 Craig Aaronson – drums (1989)
 Dominic Nardini – bass, tambourine (1990-1991, 2020)
 Michael Petrak (aka M.P.) – drums (1990-1991, 2020)
 John Pierce – bass, cello (1992-1994)
 Josh Freese – drums (1992-1993, appears on Human Cannonball only)
 Chad Fischer – live drums (1991-1994) vocals, guitar (2020)
 Chris MacDonald – live bass (1991-1992)

Discography

Studio albums

Singles

Promotional Singles

Promotional EPs

Other appearances

Music videos

References

External links
 [ School of Fish article at Allmusic Guide]

Musical groups established in 1989
Musical groups disestablished in 1994
Alternative rock groups from California